Kuin-e Olya (also Romanized as Kū’īn-e ‘Olyā; also known as Kū’īn) is a village in Bala Taleqan Rural District, in the Central District of Taleqan County, Alborz Province, Iran. At the 2006 census, its population was 66, in 25 families.

References 

Populated places in Taleqan County